Lee Jong-jun (born 16 December 1989) is a South Korean sport shooter. His achievements include a bronze medal in skeet team at the 2014 Asian Games. He represented South Korea at the 2020 Summer Olympics in Tokyo 2021, competing in men's skeet.

References

 

1989 births
Living people
South Korean male sport shooters
Shooters at the 2020 Summer Olympics
Olympic shooters of South Korea
Sport shooters from Seoul
Asian Games medalists in shooting
Shooters at the 2014 Asian Games
Shooters at the 2018 Asian Games
Medalists at the 2014 Asian Games
Asian Games bronze medalists for South Korea
20th-century South Korean people
21st-century South Korean people